X Persei is a high-mass X-ray binary system located in the constellation Perseus, approximately 950 parsecs away.  It is catalogued as 4U 0352+309 in the final Uhuru catalog of X-ray objects.

The conventional star component of X Persei has been classified either as an O-type giant or a B-type main sequence star.  It is a Be star, rotating rapidly, and at times surrounded by a disk of expelled material.  This qualifies it as a Gamma Cassiopeiae variable, and the visual range is magnitude 6 - 7.  In 1989 and 1990, the spectrum of X Persei changed from a Be star to a normal B class star while it faded significantly.  This appears to have been caused by the loss of the excretion disk.  The disk has since reformed and shows strong emission lines.

The system also contains a neutron star which is a pulsar with an unusually long period of 837 seconds.  The pulsar has shown period changes that are associated with mass transfer from the more massive primary star.  Between 1973 and 1979 it was seen to increase its rate of spin, associated with a strong x-ray flare and presumed strong mass transfer.  Since then the spin has been slowing despite small x-ray flares.

The combination of a neutron star and OB emission line star places X Persei in the Be/X-ray binary class of stars.

There is a faint optical companion separated by 22.5" which the Catalog of Components of Double and Multiple Stars refers to as X Persei B.  It is a background red giant and a candidate long period variable with the variable star designation V397 Persei.

References

Perseus (constellation)
O-type giants
B-type main-sequence stars
Neutron stars
X-ray binaries
Persei, X
Pulsars
Durchmusterung objects
018350
1209
024534
J03552309+3102449
Gamma Cassiopeiae variable stars
Emission-line stars